Takht-e Qeysar (also Romanized as Takht-e Qeyşar; also known as Takht-e Āzādī) is a village in Shahid Modarres Rural District, in the Central District of Shushtar County, Khuzestan Province, Iran. At the 2006 census, its population was 1,266, in 246 families.

References 

Populated places in Shushtar County